Khalilabad (also Romanized as Khalīlābād) is a village in Mahmudabad-e Seyyed Rural District, in the Central District of Sirjan County, Kerman Province, Iran. At the 2006 census, its population was 350, in 97 families.

References 

Populated places in Sirjan County